The Florida Gators football statistical leaders are individual statistical leaders of the Florida Gators football program in various categories, including passing, rushing, receiving, total offense, defensive stats, and kicking. Within those areas, the lists identify single-game, Single season and career leaders. The Gators represent the University of Florida in the NCAA's Southeastern Conference.

Although Florida began competing in intercollegiate football in 1906, the school's official record book considers the "modern era" to have begun in 1950. Records from before this year are often incomplete and inconsistent, and they are generally not included in these lists.

These lists are dominated by more recent players for several reasons:
 Since 1950, seasons have increased from 10 games to 11 and then 12 games in length.
 Freshmen were barred from varsity football due to conference rules since 1922, and the NCAA didn't allow freshmen to play varsity football until 1972 (with the exception of the World War II years), allowing players to have four-year careers.
 Bowl games only began counting toward single-season and career statistics in 2002. The Gators have played in 15 bowl games since then, giving recent players an extra game to accumulate statistics.
 Similarly, the Gators have played in the SEC Championship Game 12 times since it began in 1992, so players in those seasons had 12 games to rack up stats.
 Due to COVID-19 issues, the NCAA ruled that the 2020 season would not count against the athletic eligibility of any football player, giving everyone who played in that season the opportunity for five years of eligibility instead of the normal four.
 All of the top 10 Gator seasons when ranked by total offensive yards have come under recent coaches Steve Spurrier (1990–2001) and Urban Meyer (2005–2010). Indeed, the offensive lists are dominated by players who played under one of these coaches.

These lists are updated through Florida's game against Samford on November 13, 2021.

Passing

Passing yards

Passing touchdowns

Rushing

Rushing yards

Rushing touchdowns

Receiving

Receptions

Receiving yards

Receiving touchdowns

Total offense
Total offense is the sum of passing and rushing statistics. It does not include receiving or returns.

Total offense yards

Touchdowns responsible for
"Touchdowns responsible for" is the official NCAA term for combined passing and rushing touchdowns.

Defense

Interceptions

Tackles

Sacks

Kicking

Field goals made

Field goal percentage

References

Florida
Statistical Leaders